This page lists the albums that reached number one on the Top R&B/Hip-Hop Albums and Top Rap Albums charts in 2009. The Rap Albums chart partially serves as a distillation of rap-specific titles from the overall R&B/Hip-Hop Albums chart.

The top-selling R&B/hip-hop album for the year was I Am... Sasha Fierce by Beyoncé, which was released in November 2008.

Chart history

See also
2009 in music
2009 in hip hop music
List of number-one R&B/hip-hop songs of 2009 (U.S.)
List of Billboard 200 number-one albums of 2009

References 

2009
2009
United States RandB Hip Hop Albums